Myauk Pyinthe (lit. "Queen of the Northern Palace") was the second Queen of the Northern Palace of King Sithu II of the Pagan Dynasty of Myanmar (Burma).

The name Myauk Pyinthe was the name of the office, meaning "Queen of the Northern Palace". Royal chronicles do not agree on who succeeded the first North Queen Saw Lat. Yazawin Thit (1798) states that the second North Queen was a great-granddaughter of Gen. Nyaung-U Hpi, a friend and comrade of King Kyansittha, who according to Maha Yazawin (1724) and Hmannan Yazawin (1832) was the Queen of the Southern Palace. Instead Maha Yazawin and Hmannan list Pan Yin as the second ranked (North) queen. Yazawin Thit lists Pan Yin as the fourth ranked (West) queen.

All three chronicles agree that the great-granddaughter of Nyaung-U Hpi had three sons, and that Pan Yin had a son.

References

Bibliography
 
 
 
 

Queens consort of Pagan
13th-century Burmese women
12th-century Burmese women